Straight On till Morning may refer to:

Straight On till Morning (album), a 1997 album by Blues Traveler
Straight On till Morning (film), a 1972 British thriller